Shahrood University of Technology (formerly known as University of Shahrood 2010-2015) is a public university in Shahrood, Semnan, Iran.

The university was established as "The Shahrood College of Mines" (مدرسه عالي معدن شاهرود, Midresh-e 'ali Mi'dân Shaherud) in 1973 by Changiz Malekipur, and was elevated to university status in 1994. Finally, thanks to the efforts and pursuit of university president and the staff at the time and the expansion of different programs and the development of post-graduate levels, another great achievement was gained for the university in that the Development Council of the ministry in a session dated 2002/6/9 announced his agreement with the promotion of the university to Shahrood University of technology. The university currently operates 11 faculties, offering 32 degrees to students at bachelors, masters, and PhD levels.

The significant achievements of the university from 1997 up to now are as following:

1. setting up the Ph.D. programs for mining engineering, physics and electrical engineering 
2. setting up the master programs in 
3. promotion of Shahrood University to Shahrood University of technology 
4. the approval of long-term Academic Program of the university:

According to this program approved by the Council of Development in session dated 2002/9/16 and due to the potentials of the university, the number of programs will increase to 93 by the end of the Nation Fourth Program of Development.
The university was the first university in Iran and the fourth in the world to offer Robotics Engineering at bachelors level.
The university's faculty of mining and agriculture is among the best, offering numerous courses up to the PhD level. The university is among the growing universities in Iran.

This university is one of several technical universities in Iran. Technical universities of Iran include: 
1.Sharif university of Technology(Aryamehr)
2.Amirkabir university of Technology(Tehran Polytechnic)
3.Iran university of Science & Technology
4.K. N. Toosi University of Technology
5.Shahrood University of Technology 
6.Sahand University of Technology 
7.Babol Noshirvani University of Technology

See also
Higher Education in Iran
Shahrood's library management system

External links
Shahrood University of Technology
unOfficial Website of the Department of Information Technology & Computer Engineering 
Department of Information Technology & Computer Engineering
Faculty of Mechanical Engineering
Department of Electrical & Robotic Engineering 
Department of Civil & Architectural Engineering
Faculty Architectural Engineering and Urbanism
Department of Agricultural Engineering
Department of Chemistry
School of Mining, Petroleum & Geophysics Engineering
Shahrood University of Technology's Central Library
 Department of Geology Sciences

Sh
Educational institutions established in 1973
Education in Semnan Province
1973 establishments in Iran
Buildings and structures in Semnan Province